Oymaağaç is a village in the Vezirköprü, Samsun Province, Turkey.

References

External links
Homepage of the Oymaağaç-Nerik archaeological project (in German)

Villages in Vezirköprü District